Chris Crippin (born August 4, 1974) is a Canadian musician. He is best known as the former drummer of the rock band Hedley. Crippin departed the band in 2017.

Outside of Hedley, he was the drum technician on the 2000 album Drawing Black Lines by the American band Project 86. He also played drums for Bif Naked. In 2018, Crippin started a new project called MrCrippin.

Early life
Crippin began to have an interest in music at a very young age. It wasn't until his mid-teen years when he started learning how to play drums.

Career
Before joining Hedley, Crippin worked as a drum technician and played drums for several different artists. Crippin was the drum technician on the 2000 albums Drawing Black Lines and L.D. 50 by Project 86 and Mudvayne respectively. Crippin also spent two years touring with Bif Naked. He later joined Everything After before they split in 2004. Crippin formed a new project called Bomb the Past, a group he fronted.

Crippin spent 13 years with Hedley and released 6 albums with the group. In 2018, it was reported that Crippin had been fired by the band in 2017.

Amidst the allegations against lead singer Jacob Hoggard from Hedley, Crippin spoke out against his former band mate. He stated he was "extremely rude" and was "hard to work with." Since then, Crippin started his own band called MrCrippin in 2018 and released his debut single "Big Brother" in 2021.

Crippin has also worked as a drum technician for the likes of 3 Inches of Blood, Billy Talent, From Autumn to Ashes and Rod Laver.

Personal life
Crippin owns two companies, Crippin Health Inc. and Mrdrumsalot Music Inc.

Discography
with Project 86
 Drawing Black Lines (2000)
 
with Hedley

 Hedley (2005)
 Famous Last Words (2007)
 The Show Must Go (2009)
 Storms (2011)
 Wild Life (2013)
 Hello (2015)

Singles

Additional credits

References

External links
 

1974 births
Living people
Canadian rock drummers
Canadian male drummers
Canadian rock singers
Musicians from British Columbia
People from Burnaby
People from Surrey, British Columbia
Canadian punk rock drummers
21st-century Canadian drummers
21st-century Canadian male singers